Erich Joch (17 February 1913 – 9 March 2003) was a German athlete. He competed in the men's triple jump at the 1936 Summer Olympics.

References

1913 births
2003 deaths
Athletes (track and field) at the 1936 Summer Olympics
German male triple jumpers
Olympic athletes of Germany
Place of birth missing